Valeriy Vasylyovych Pidluzhny (22 August 1952 – 4 October 2021) was a long jumper who represented the Soviet Union. Born in Donetsk, Ukrainian SSR, he trained at the city's Trudovye Rezervy. A three-time Olympian, he won two silver medals at the European Athletics Indoor Championships as well as a gold medal at the 1974 European Athletics Championships and a bronze medal at the 1980 Summer Olympics.

His first international medals of note were three gold medals at the 1970 European Athletics Junior Championships. Senior gold medals followed at the 1973 Summer Universiade and the 1973 European Cup.

Pidluzhny won nine national titles in long jump during his career, including five straight wins at the Soviet Athletics Championships from 1973 to 1977 and four titles at the Soviet Indoor Athletics Championships between 1973 and 1980.

International competitions

National titles
Soviet Athletics Championships
Long jump: 1973, 1974, 1975, 1976, 1977
Soviet Indoor Athletics Championships
Long jump: 1973, 1976, 1979, 1980

See also
Long jump at the Olympics
List of Olympic medalists in athletics (men)
List of European Athletics Championships medalists (men)
List of European Athletics Indoor Championships medalists (men)

References

External links

1952 births
2021 deaths
Sportspeople from Donetsk
Ukrainian male long jumpers
Soviet male long jumpers
Olympic athletes of the Soviet Union
Olympic bronze medalists for the Soviet Union
Olympic bronze medalists in athletics (track and field)
Athletes (track and field) at the 1972 Summer Olympics
Athletes (track and field) at the 1976 Summer Olympics
Athletes (track and field) at the 1980 Summer Olympics
Universiade medalists in athletics (track and field)
European Athletics Championships medalists
Universiade gold medalists for the Soviet Union
Medalists at the 1980 Summer Olympics
Medalists at the 1979 Summer Universiade